Gabriel Shane Dunn (formerly Gaby Dunn; born ) is an American writer, podcaster, actor, and filmmaker. Since 2014, Dunn has hosted the YouTube comedy show and podcast Just Between Us with fellow former BuzzFeed writer Allison Raskin. Dunn also hosts the podcast Bad with Money, which launched in 2016 and which primarily focuses on personal finances, while also discussing subjects including poverty and economic oppression. Their debut young adult novel I Hate Everyone but You, co-authored with Raskin, was published in 2017 and made The New York Times Best Seller list. Dunn has also published two finance-related books, as well as a graphic novel. They were formerly a writer, director, and performer for BuzzFeed Video before leaving to focus on Just Between Us.

Education 
Dunn attended Emerson College in Boston, Massachusetts. They majored in Multimedia Journalism, graduating in 2009.

Dunn began performing during their first year at Emerson with the sketch comedy troupe Chocolate Cake City (CCC). Dunn had wanted to audition for CCC, but was too scared to do so until they were urged to take the audition slot of a former boyfriend who had become sick the day before and could not perform. Their audition was successful and they became a member of the troupe. At the time they considered themself a better writer than actor, and working in CCC allowed them to do both, since members were expected to write and perform their own sketches.

During their second year at Emerson, Dunn began a two-year stint as a crime reporter for The Boston Globe. They worked the 6:30 pm – 2:30 am shift, using a police scanner to monitor potential news items, and then driving to the scene of the crime to write about it. After their junior year, Dunn worked as an intern at The Daily Show with Jon Stewart.

Writing

100 Interviews 
In October 2010, Dunn created 100 Interviews, a Tumblr blog in which they intended to publish transcripts of 100 interviews, given over the course of a single year, with a variety of different people. Interview subjects included a transgender person, a rocket scientist, an Abraham Lincoln expert, and Stephen Colbert. Their initial inspiration for the project stemmed from their own personal desire to meet different people and hear their stories. However, Dunn also wanted to offer readers the opportunity to "vicariously meet people" whose lives were different from their own.

Because 100 Interviews was an independent project, Dunn sometimes solicited interviews with candidates in non-traditional and unexpected ways. Children's horror author R. L. Stine agreed to sit for an interview after Dunn "cold-tweeted" him on Twitter. After trying and failing to interview Colbert by crashing a $2,000-a-plate dinner gala, Dunn settled for asking him questions during a pre-show Q&A for The Colbert Report. Dunn's attempts to gain wider exposure for what they called their "diary journalism" were initially met with rejection. Dunn has been recognized as a success case of the use of social media for self-promotion, particularly via Tumblr, the micro-blogging service and web application platform through which they initially self-published their interviews, and Twitter.

In December 2010, The Village Voice named 100 Interviews the "Best Tumblr" in their annual Web Awards. New York Times culture editor Adam Sternbergh also discovered Dunn via 100 Interviews, and invited them to write for the Times.

Freelance and staff writing 
Dunn began doing freelance writing for publications including Thought Catalog and GOOD. In 2012, they began writing a regular column in The New York Times titled "They're Famous! (On the Internet)", which profiled various Internet personalities. In 2013, Dunn was a staff writer for Thought Catalog. A collection of their essays for Thought Catolog was published under the title Maybe In Another Universe in 2013.

Books 
Dunn wrote their debut novel, I Hate Everyone but You, with Allison Raskin and published it on September 5, 2017. The young adult fiction novel follows two college freshmen and best friends, and is told through emails and text messages exchanged between the two. It made The New York Times Best Seller list in October of the same year. Dunn and Raskin published a sequel in July 2019, titled Please Send Help.

In January 2019, Dunn published Bad With Money: The Imperfect Art of Getting Your Financial Sh*t Together, a book based on the podcast. In June 2022, they published a second finance-related book titled Stimulus Wreck: Rebuilding After a Financial Disaster.

In October 2019, Dunn's published their debut graphic novel, Bury the Lede, which was illustrated by Claire Roe and published by BOOM! Studios. It is a queer crime thriller that was inspired by Dunn's own experiences working as a young reporter at the Boston Globe.

YouTube and podcasting 
Dunn became well-known as a member of BuzzFeed Video's early cohort of video personalities. Dunn first appeared in BuzzFeed videos as a performer, later also taking on responsibilities as a writer and producer. They left BuzzFeed in 2015 to focus on their other projects, including Just Between Us. They were a producer of the independent community radio station WFMU.

Just Between Us 
In April 2014, Dunn created a comedic variety YouTube show with their best friend Allison Raskin called Just Between Us. The two play characters based on themselves: Dunn plays a sex-positive, bisexual, feminist in contrast to Raskin's uptight, straight, single character. They began with giving love advice, then added comedy sketches. The advice show sometimes features guests, which in the past have included family members and close friends. , Just Between Us had around 646,000 subscribers and more than 178million views on YouTube. In March 2019, Dunn and Raskin launched a podcast version of the show.

Bad with Money 
In August 2016, Dunn began the podcast Bad with Money with the intent of exposing and analyzing money problems that they felt were not openly discussed. They've used the podcast to discuss their own financial experiences in regards to debt and their career, talk about systematic financial systems in place that make finances difficult, and give advice. Their guests have included financial advisor Suze Orman and New Yorker journalist Jane Mayer.

Apocalypse Untreated 
In 2020, Dunn created, wrote, and starred in Apocalypse Untreated, a post-apocalyptic fiction podcast about teenagers in a wilderness rehab and troubled teen program trying to survive after a meteor strike. The podcast was co-written with Brittani Nichols, and published through the Audible Originals program.

Film and television 
Dunn has written several movie scripts, and has sold several pilots. Dunn played the recurring character of Brie in Take My Wife, a television series that aired from 2016–2018. In 2018, they worked as a writer on Netflix's animated sitcom Big Mouth.

In December 2022, Dunn's directorial debut short film Grindr Baby was selected for Frameline Voices 2023, a curated program of short films and episodic content representing experiences unique to LGBTQ+ people and communities.

Personal life 
Dunn is non-binary and uses they/them or he/him pronouns. They came out in a July 5, 2021, interview on the Gender Reveal podcast, in which they said they had been exploring their gender and were probably non-binary. They said they had started using they/them pronouns, which they later confirmed as a permanent change. In January 2023, Dunn revealed via social media that they had changed their name to Gabriel Shane ("Gabe"). Prior to that, they used the name Gaby.

Dunn is bisexual and polyamorous. They are Jewish. They have bipolar disorder, and their hope to see the disorder more accurately portrayed in media in part motivated them to create Apocalypse Untreated.

Works

Books 

 Maybe In Another Universe (2013)
 I Hate Everyone but You – with Allison Raskin (2017)
 Please Send Help – with Allison Raskin (2019)
 Bad With Money: The Imperfect Art of Getting Your Financial Sh*t Together (2019)
 Bury the Lede (2019)
 Stimulus Wreck: Rebuilding After a Financial Disaster (2022)

Films 

 Grindr Baby (2023)

References

External links
 
 

1980s births
20th-century LGBT people
21st-century American actors
21st-century American comedians
21st-century American Jews
21st-century American journalists
21st-century American non-fiction writers
21st-century American novelists
21st-century American screenwriters
21st-century LGBT people
American bisexual actors
American bisexual writers
American bloggers
American feminists
American financial writers
American graphic novelists
American LGBT actors
American LGBT comedians
American LGBT novelists
American LGBT screenwriters
American non-binary actors
American non-binary writers
American podcasters
American television actors
American television writers
American writers
American YouTubers
Bisexual non-binary people
BuzzFeed people
Comedy YouTubers
Emerson College alumni
Jewish American entertainers
Jewish American screenwriters
Jewish American writers
LGBT Jews
LGBT YouTubers
Living people
Non-binary comedians
Non-binary directors
Non-binary novelists
Non-binary screenwriters
People with bipolar disorder
Place of birth missing (living people)
Polyamorous people
Transgender Jews
YouTube podcasters